Paul Frederick Daneman (29 October 1925 – 28 April 2001) was an English film, television, and theatre actor. He was successful for more than 40 years on stage, film and television.

Early life
Paul Daneman was born in Islington, London. He attended the Haberdashers' Aske's School in Elstree, Hertfordshire, and Sir William Borlase's Grammar School in Marlow, Buckinghamshire, and studied stage design at Reading University where he joined the dramatic society. His passion for the stage ignited during World War II when entertaining troops in the RAF, in which he served with Bomber Command from 1943 until 1947. After the war he abandoned a career as a painter in order to go to RADA.

Career
After training at RADA he joined Bristol Old Vic, Birmingham Rep, and the Old Vic for four years. At the British premiere in August 1955 he created the role of Vladimir in Waiting For Godot, at the Arts Theatre in Westminster. 
 
His film credits included Time Without Pity (1957), Zulu (1964), How I Won the War (1967) and Oh! What a Lovely War (1969).

Daneman's TV credits include: The Adventures of Robin Hood, The Four Just Men, Persuasion, Danger Man, Out of the Unknown, The Saint, Spy Trap, Blake's 7, The Professionals and Rumpole of the Bailey. The BBC's 1960 landmark production An Age of Kings, a fifteen-part drama that combined Shakespeare's histories of the kings of England and presented them in chronological order, featured Daneman as Richard III. In the early 60s he toured West Africa and Australia.

Daneman played the husband of Wendy Craig in the original series of the popular BBC sitcom
Not in Front of the Children before being replaced by Ronald Hines. He also played Bilbo Baggins in the 1968 BBC Radio dramatisation of J. R. R. Tolkien's The Hobbit. In that same year he appeared in the Sherlock Holmes detective series episode "The Sign of Four" as two brothers with Peter Cushing as Sherlock.

While recovering from a heart attack, he wrote the sitcom Affairs of the Heart. In 1995 Daneman published If I Only Had Wings, a novel inspired by his experiences in the Royal Air Force during World War II.

Personal life
Daneman was married twice. He married his first wife Susan Courtney in 1952, and they adopted a daughter, but divorced. He and his second wife, Meredith Kinmont (whom he married in 1965), had two daughters. Meredith, a former student of the Royal Ballet School, was an author and biographer of Dame Margot Fonteyn.

Death
Aged 75, Daneman died in 2001. His body was buried at East Sheen Cemetery in South-West London.

Filmography

See also
Tale Spinners for Children

Notes

References

External links
 

1925 births
2001 deaths
20th-century English male actors
English male film actors
English male television actors
English television writers
Royal Air Force personnel of World War II
People from Islington (district)
People educated at Haberdashers' Boys' School
People educated at Sir William Borlase's Grammar School
Alumni of the University of Reading
Alumni of RADA
Male actors from London
20th-century English screenwriters